The Strathfieldsaye Football Netball Club, nicknamed the Storm, is an Australian rules football and netball club based in the Bendigo suburb of Strathfieldsaye, Victoria.

The club teams currently compete in the Bendigo Football Netball League.

History
A predecessor of the current club was founded in 1978 as the "Mandurang-Strathfieldsaye Junior Football Club". This club was formed due to the need to facilitate the increasing population of junior footballers in the Mandurang and Strathfieldsaye district. The club commenced playing in the Bendigo Junior Football League. In 2003 the club became known as the Strathfieldsaye Junior Football Club (Strathfieldsaye JFC).

By 2007 there was enough interest in a senior club forming and in September 2007 the "Strathfieldsaye Football Netball Club" was formed. There were discussions on whether to join the stronger, regional major league and compete in the Bendigo Football League or join the lower, regional district league  and compete in the Heathcote District Football League to get the club established, but the members voted overwhelmingly for the Bendigo Football League. The club decided that the Bendigo League was ultimately where they wanted to play, so the committee submitted a business plan to get to a higher standard as quickly as possible. In 2008, an application to join the Bendigo Football League for the following season was submitted and accepted. The club identity 'Strath Storm' was created and the club adopted playing colours of blue & white hoops as these were the colours of the Strathfieldsaye JFC.

In 2009 the Strathfieldsaye Storm competed in senior competition for the first time and in 2012 they played in their first finals series winning both the elimination and first semi-final, before losing the preliminary final.

In 2013 the Storm made their first Grand Final after finishing the Home and Away season on top with 12 wins and 1 draw from 16 games, however lost the Grand Final to Golden Square by 21 points. The Storm went on to claim their first Premiership in 2014, defeating Sandhurst by 55 points.

In 2017, all the football grades of the club (seniors, reserves and U18) won the premiership.

Club song

*The term "Ranga's" is a direct reference to the foundation club being Mandurang/Strathfieldsaye JFC and reflects the heritage of the original club.

Year by year performance (home and away only) 
 * denotes Premiership winning year
< denotes ladder position held when Season was abandoned due to COVID-19 pandemic in Victoria

Honours
Premierships & Grand Finals

Senior Football Club Captains 

Michael Pilcher & Jono Gawthrop 2009 - 2010 

Shannon Geary 2011 - 2015 (Premiership 2014 & 2015)

Jayden Donaldson & Shannon Geary 2016 - 2017 (Premiership 2017)

Kallen Geary 2018 - 2019 (Premiership 2019) 

Lachlan Sharp 2020 - Current

Bibliography
 History of Football in the Bendigo District, John Stoward,

References

External links
 SportsTG website

Australian rules football clubs in Victoria (Australia)
Australian rules football clubs established in 2007
Sports clubs established in 2007
2007 establishments in Australia
Netball teams in Victoria (Australia)